Ar-Halba was the third known ruler of Ugarit, an Ancient Syrian city state in northwestern Syria, reigning for no less than two years, possibly from 1315 to 1313 BC. He succeeded king Niqmaddu II.

Very little is known about his short reign, as he is only mentioned in six juridical texts. The one that gives the most information about him is his 'Last will', where he warns his brothers not to marry his wife Kubaba after his death, contrary to the levirate custom. The intriguing letter gave room to plenty of speculation about him, with his non-Semitic name that stands out amongst all Ugaritan kings further enhancing the mystery, with some even suggesting that he was not the legitimate heir to the throne.

Later on, he was supposedly forced by the Hittite king Mursili II to abdicate the throne, in favour of his brother, Niqmepa. He was probably sent to exile afterwards.

References

Ugaritic kings
14th-century BC people